The 2006 Thailand Open was a tennis tournament played on indoor hard courts. It was the 4th edition of the Thailand Open, and was part of the International Series of the 2006 ATP Tour. It took place at the Impact Arena in Bangkok, Thailand, from September 25 through October 1, 2006. Jonathan Erlich and Andy Ram won in the final 6–2, 2–6, [10–4] against Andy Murray and Jamie Murray.

Seeds

Draw

Main draw

References

Doubles